WHCG (1360 AM) is a Christian radio station broadcasting a Southern Gospel format. Licensed to Metter, Georgia, United States, the station is currently owned by Dennis Jones, through licensee RadioJones, LLC.

References

External links

HCG
Southern Gospel radio stations in the United States